Sana Dalawa ang Puso (International title: Two Hearts) is a 2018 Philippine drama television series starring Jodi Sta. Maria in her first dual role, together with Richard Yap and Robin Padilla. The series premiered on ABS-CBN's PrimeTanghali noontime block and worldwide via The Filipino Channel from January 29, 2018, to September 14, 2018, replacing Ikaw Lang ang Iibigin and was replaced by Playhouse.

The series marks the Sta. Maria-Yap reunion five years after the long-running pre-noontime drama Be Careful With My Heart.

The show began airing re-runs since September 26, 2022 to March 5, 2023 on ALLTV.

Synopsis
The story revolves around Mona and Lisa: two different women with identical faces, both facing challenging ordeals in their lives.

Lisa is a strict and hardworking boss in her father's business, the Laureano Group of Companies. Her world suddenly turns upside down when her father Juancho betroths her to their business rival's son Martin Co. In order to avoid the arranged marriage, Lisa hides with one of her workers, Leo Tabayoyong.

Mona, a tomboyish girl and Lisa's look-alike, works as a bet collector in cockfights and is struggling to save her father from peril after he gets involved in a networking scam.

What will happen if the two women with the same face cross paths? Will they be able to solve each other's problems?

In the end, it is revealed that Mona and Lisa are the identical twin daughters of Sandra Tan.

Cast and characters

Main cast
Jodi Sta. Maria as Ramona "Mona" Bulalayao / Ramona Tan-Co and Elisabeth "Lisa" Laureano / Elisabeth Tan-Tabayoyong
Richard Yap as Martin Co
Robin Padilla as Leonardo "Leo" Tabayoyong

Supporting cast
Christopher de Leon as Juancho Laureano
Alma Moreno as Lena Bulalayao
Edgar Mortiz as Ramon Bulalayao
Boboy Garovillo as Miguel Co
Denise Laurel as Primera Ortega
Irma Adlawan as Sandra Tan
Pinky Amador as Adele Laureano
Bayani Agbayani as Victory "Oyo" Domingo
Nikki Valdez as Kimberly "Kim" Torres
Kitkat as Libereta "Leb" Manatad
Miles Ocampo as Christina "Tinay" Tabayoyong
Ylona Garcia as Tadhana "Tads" Tabayoyong
Aliya Parcs as Rachel Sovichel
Carla Martinez as Teresa "Resa" Co
Annali "Ali" Forbes as Theresa "Tisay" Tabayoyong
Elia Ilano as Tamarra "TamTam" Tabayoyong
William Lorenzo as Jason  Chua
Lito Pimentel as Leader  Rizal
Rey "PJ" Abellana as Director Luna
Alexander Diaz as Jacinto
Maika Rivera as Irish
Ryan Bang as Chot
Leo Martinez as Mr. Supapi
Markus Paterson as Patrick Sovichel
Henz Villaraiz as Carlos "Cocoy" Mendiola

Extended cast
Ariel Ureta as Jacob Co
Pinky Marquez as Joana Chavez
Ramon Christopher as John Chavez
Arlene Muhlach as Baby Ortega
Junjun Quintana as Steve Co
Marc Acueza as Jason Chavez
Hannah Ledesma as Georgina
Hyubs Azarcon as Dongs
Gerard Acao as George
Kiray Celis as Anya
Angelo Ilagan as Ian
Heaven Peralejo as Sitti
Raine Salamante as Carol
Anna Vicente as Emily
CK Kieron as Ethan
Patrick Sugui as Nick
Manuel Chua as Emil

Guest cast
Jana Agoncillo as young Lisa and Mona
Patrick Garcia as young Juancho
Simon Ibarra
Victor Silayan as Donnie Pamintuan
Boom Labrusca as Marlon Fernandez
Paolo Paraiso as Anthony Falconia
 Kiel Ortega as Paolo Azarcon
Pilita Corrales as Leonora Chavez
 Kristine Abbey as Facilitator

Ratings

See also
List of programs broadcast by ABS-CBN
List of drama series of ABS-CBN

References

External links
 

ABS-CBN drama series
Philippine romantic comedy television series
2018 Philippine television series debuts
2018 Philippine television series endings
Television series by Star Creatives
Filipino-language television shows
Television shows set in the Philippines